Elophila rivulalis is a species of moth in the family Crambidae. It is found in the Netherlands, Belgium, France, Germany, Poland, Austria, Hungary, Croatia, Italy and Greece.

The wingspan is 20–25 mm. In Italy, adults have been recorded on wing from June to September. Older records also list sightings in April. This indicates there might be two generations per year.

The larval stage is unknown, but it is thought the larvae live in the water.

References

Moths described in 1834
Acentropinae
Moths of Europe
Aquatic insects